A Certified Resident Manager is a property management professional designation earned through the Minnesota Multi-Housing Association or the Resident Managers' Training Institute in Vancouver, British Columbia.  Certified resident managers are deemed by the association to have obtained a certain level of professional competence in the management and administration of multi-unit residential housing.

Notes and references

See also
Building superintendent
Property manager
Property management

Property management
Professional titles and certifications